The Bayer designation μ Octantis (mu Octantis) is shared by two stars in the constellation Octans:
μ1 Octantis, HR 7863 or HD 196051
μ2 Octantis, HR 7864 or HD 196067

Octantis, Mu
Octans